Tropidophorus hainanus, the Hainan water skink,  is a species of skink found in China and Vietnam.

References

hainanus
Reptiles of China
Reptiles of Vietnam
Reptiles described in 1923
Taxa named by Malcolm Arthur Smith